{{Speciesbox
| image = Eudonia melanaegis female.jpg
| image_caption = Female
| image2 = Eudonia melanaegis male.jpg
| image2_caption = Male
| taxon = Eudonia melanaegis| authority = (Meyrick, 1884)
| synonyms = 

| synonyms_ref = 
}}Eudonia melanaegis'' is a moth in the family Crambidae. It was named by Edward Meyrick in 1884. This species is endemic to New Zealand.

Adults have been recorded on the wing in December and January.

References

Moths described in 1884
Eudonia
Moths of New Zealand
Endemic fauna of New Zealand
Taxa named by Edward Meyrick
Endemic moths of New Zealand